Parliamentary elections were held in Equatorial Guinea on 12 November 2017. The ruling Democratic Party of Equatorial Guinea won all but one of the seats in the Chamber of Deputies, every seat in the Senate and control of every local council.

Electoral system
The 100 members of the Chamber of Deputies are elected by closed-list proportional representation from multi-member constituencies based on the 19 electoral districts with an electoral threshold of 10%. Of the 70 members of the Senate, 55 are elected from the same 19 electoral districts also by closed-list proportional representation and with an electoral threshold of 10%. An additional 15 members are appointed.

Results

Chamber of Deputies

Senate

References

Legislative elections in Equatorial Guinea
Equatorial Guinea
2017 in Equatorial Guinea
November 2017 events in Africa
Election and referendum articles with incomplete results